Konstantin Pluzhnikov may refer to:

 Konstantin Pluzhnikov (tenor) (born 1941), Russian operatic tenor
 Konstantin Pluzhnikov (gymnast) (born 1987), Russian gymnast